Anthony George Clement (born April 10, 1976) is a former American football offensive tackle. He was drafted by the Arizona Cardinals in the second round of the 1998 NFL Draft. He played college football at Louisiana-Lafayette.

Clement has also played for the San Francisco 49ers, New York Jets and New England Patriots.

Early years
Clement attended Cecilia High School in Cecilia, Louisiana, and was a letterman in football and track & field. In football, he was a starting defensive tackle and won All-District 6A honors, and All-Louisiana Class AAA honors.

College career
Clement attended the University of Louisiana at Lafayette.

Professional career

Arizona Cardinals
Clement was selected by the Arizona Cardinals in the second round (36th overall) of the 1998 NFL Draft. He played for the Cardinals until the 2004 season when he was released.

San Francisco 49ers
He signed with the San Francisco 49ers but only played one season for them in 2005.  He started just 6 games.

New York Jets
Clement was then signed by the New York Jets and played two seasons for them, in which he started every game. After the 2007 season Clement was released by the Jets.

New England Patriots
On July 21, Clement was signed by the New England Patriots.  He was placed on injured reserve on August 3, 2008, and released from IR on September 10, 2008.

References

External links
New England Patriots bio
New York Jets bio

1976 births
Living people
Sportspeople from Lafayette, Louisiana
American football offensive tackles
Louisiana Ragin' Cajuns football players
Arizona Cardinals players
San Francisco 49ers players
New York Jets players
Players of American football from Louisiana
New England Patriots players